Still Live is a double-CD live album by American pianist Keith Jarrett's "Standards Trio" featuring bassist Gary Peacock and drummer Jack DeJohnette. It was recorded on July 13th of 1986 at Philharmonic Hall in Munich, Germany. This concert was organized and co-produced by Loft and ECM and was part of the "Klaviersommer 1986". It was released by ECM Records in 1988.

July 1986 Tour 
Still Live was a concert that took place during the ambitious "Standards trio" July 1986 European tour which, according to www.keithjarrett.org, visited 14 cities in 26 days.

While on tour, Jarrett would still find spare time to record the clavichord album Book of Ways.

 1 - Verona (Italy)
 3 - Lugano (Switzerland)
 6 - Hollabrunn (Austria)
 8 - Milano (Italy)
 9 - Cannes (France)
 11 - Vienne (France)
 13 - Munich (Germany)
 16 - Istanbul (Turkey)
 18 - Vitoria-Gasteiz (Spain)
 19 - London (UK)
 21 - Molde (Norway)
 22 - Copenhaguen (Denmark)
 24 - Montpellier (France)
 26 - Antibes (France)

Reception 
As for the 31st Annual Grammy award (1988) the album was nominated in the "Best Jazz Instrumental Performance (Group)" category. So far, up to 2020 there had been no further Keith Jarrett's "Standards trio" nominations.

On his 2002 Records To Die For Lonnie Brownell at Stereophile marks that:

The Allmusic review by Richard S. Ginell awarded the album 3 stars and states, "Jarrett treats his brace of pop and jazz standards with unpredictable, often eloquently melodic and structural originality". Regarding some critic's particular observations on Jarrett's idiosyncrasies, Ginell adds that "there is a considerable amount of Jarrett vocalizing, though; sometimes he sounds like a tortured animal."

Track listing 
 "My Funny Valentine" (Lorenz Hart, Richard Rodgers) - 10:51  
 "Autumn Leaves" (Joseph Kosma, Johnny Mercer, Jacques Prévert) - 10:24  
 "When I Fall in Love" (Edward Heyman, Victor Young) - 8:22  
 "The Song Is You" (Oscar Hammerstein II, Jerome Kern) - 17:33  
 "Come Rain or Come Shine" (Harold Arlen, Johnny Mercer) - 10:06  
 "Late Lament" (Paul Desmond) - 8:40  
 "You and the Night and the Music/Extension" (Howard Dietz, Arthur Schwartz/Keith Jarrett) - 10:44  
 "Intro/Someday My Prince Will Come" (Jarrett/Frank Churchill, Larry Morey) - 8:23  
 "Billie's Bounce" (Charlie Parker) * - 9:06  
 "I Remember Clifford" (Benny Golson) - 4:00 
 
Total effective playing time: 1:33:37 (the album contains 4:36 applause approximately)

* Not included in original LP release of 1986. Included in every CD release including that of 1986.

Personnel 
 Keith Jarrett – piano
 Gary Peacock - bass
 Jack DeJohnette - drums

Production
 Manfred Eicher - producer
 Martin Wieland - recording engineer
 Barbara Wojirsch - design
 Rose Anne Colavito - photography

References 

Standards Trio albums
Gary Peacock live albums
Jack DeJohnette live albums
Keith Jarrett live albums
1986 live albums
ECM Records live albums
Albums produced by Manfred Eicher